The 2011–12 Lebanese Premier League was the 51st season of top-tier football in Lebanon. A total of twelve teams competed in the league, with Al Ahed the defending champions.

Teams 
Shabab Al-Ghazieh and Al Islah were relegated to the second level of Lebanese football after ending the 2010–11 season in the bottom two places. Promoted from the second level were Al-Ahli Saida and Tripoli SC

Stadia and locations

Personnel and sponsorship

League table

Fixtures and results

References 
League Table

2011–12 Lebanese Premier League
Lebanese Premier League seasons
Leb
1